Blisters in the Pit of My Heart is the second studio album by English band Martha. It was released in July 2016 by Fortuna Pop! in the UK/EU and Dirtnap Records in the US.

According to Pitchfork, the album's lead single "Goldman's Detective Agency," "reimagines early 20th century anarchist Emma Goldman as a private investigator'.

In Ice Cream And Sunscreen the line "December boy you got it wrong" is a reference to the refrain of "September Gurls" by Big Star, "December boy's got it bad".

Curly & Raquel references two characters from the British soap opera Coronation Street as well as paraphrasing lyrics from a Billy Bragg song.

St Paul’s (Westerberg Comprehensive) is about 'queer students at catholic school' and the title of which references both Paul Westerberg and the film Heathers. The lyrics also reference Bastards of Young, a song by Westerberg's band The Replacements.

Accolades

Track listing

References

2016 albums
Martha (band) albums